Caladenia orestes is a plant in the orchid family Orchidaceae and is endemic to an area in the south of New South Wales. It is a ground orchid with a single leaf and one or two cream-coloured to light reddish flowers. It grows in forest on hillsides around Burrinjuck.

Description
narrow egg-shaped to elliptic near its base then tapers to a blackish glandular tip. The lateral sepals and petals spread widely, turn down slightly or droop. Flowering occurs during October and in early November.

Taxonomy and naming
Caladenia orestes was first formally described in 2006 by David Jones who gave it the name Arachnorchis orestes. The specimen was collected near Burrinjuck village and the description was published in Australian Orchid Research. In 2010 Gary Backhouse changed the name to Caladenia orestes and published the change in The Victorian Naturalist. The specific epithet (orestes) is an Ancient Greek word meaning "mountaineer" referring to the steep mountain slopes where this species grows.

Distribution and habitat
This spider orchid grows with grasses or shrubs in forest on steep hillsides around Burrinjuck in the south-west slopes region of New South Wales.

References

orestes
Endemic orchids of Australia
Orchids of New South Wales
Plants described in 2006
Taxa named by David L. Jones (botanist)